William Peere Williams MP (c. 1664 – 10 June 1736) was a politician in Great Britain.  He was Member of Parliament for Bishop's Castle from 1722 to 1727. Williams was born in Greyfriars, Chichester, Sussex, England to Peere Williams and Joanna Oyley.

Family 
William married Anne Hutchins, daughter of Sir George Hutchins. They had four sons: Hutchins Williams, Frederick, William-Peere, George and two daughters: Anne Williams, and Louisa .

References

Burke, Bernard. A Genealogical and Heraldic Dictionary of the Landed Gentry of Great Britain and Ireland. London: Harrison, 1858. (p. 414) googlebooks Retrieved 7 February 2009

1660s births
1736 deaths
Members of the Parliament of Great Britain for English constituencies
British MPs 1722–1727
People from Chichester